Hans Gufler is a Danish curler and curling coach.

At the national level, he is a Danish men's and mixed curling champion curler.

Teams

Men's

Mixed

Record as a coach of national teams

References

External links
 
 

Living people
1960s births
Danish male curlers
Danish curling champions
Danish curling coaches
Date of birth missing (living people)
Place of birth missing (living people)